The 2012 UEFS Futsal Men's Championship was the tenth men's UEFS futsal championship, held in Brest (Belarus) from May 14 to 19, with 9 national teams. Belgium won their first ever European championship defeating the Czech Republic 4-1 in the final.

European Union of Futsal (UEFS) organizes the European Championship biennially.

Teams

First round

Group A

Group B

Group C

Final round

Quarter finals

Places 5-8 

Semifinals

Places 7-8

Places 5-6

Places 3-4

FINAL

Final standings

References

External links
Results UEFS website
UEFS blog

UEFS Futsal Men's Championship
UEFS
2012 in Belarusian football
International futsal competitions hosted by Belarus